The Cathedral of the Immaculate Conception is a Roman Catholic church near the Mansion District in Albany, New York, United States. Built in the period of the 1848-1852, it is the mother church of the Diocese of Albany. In 1976 it was listed on the National Register of Historic Places.

It has several claims to architectural and ecclesiastical history. Designed by Irish American architect Patrick Keely to accommodate Albany's growing population of Catholic immigrants, it is the second-oldest cathedral in the state, after St. Patrick's Cathedral in New York City. It is also the third oldest Catholic cathedral in the United States, and the first American Catholic cathedral in the Neo-Gothic architectural style.

The interior features the original stained glass windows, imported from England, and award-winning Stations of the Cross statuary. When completed, it was the tallest building in Albany. It has hosted visits by cardinals and leaders of other faiths, including one Archbishop of Canterbury, and the weddings of two Catholic governors' daughters. In 1986 it hosted the first-ever service of forgiveness between Catholics and Jews on Palm Sunday, an event commemorated by a sculpture outside the building.

Construction of the cathedral, at the behest of the diocese's first bishop, John McCloskey, took four years. Its south tower took 40, and it was not consecrated until its 50th anniversary in 1902. The construction of Empire State Plaza, the nearby New York state government complex, threatened the cathedral in the 1960s when it required the demolition of most of the surrounding neighborhood. It has been through several renovations in its history, including a $30 million restoration early in the 21st century.

Building

The cathedral is located in a one-acre lot on the southwest corner of the intersection of Eagle Street and Madison Avenue (U.S. Route 20). The terrain sloping gently westward from the Hudson River roughly three-quarters of a mile (1.1 km) to the east. It is just outside the Mansion Historic District, also listed on the National Register. Bleecker Park is just across Eagle; beyond it are rowhouses that contribute to that district.

Other than that, the surrounding neighborhood consists of large state-government buildings and the spaces around them. To its south a parking lot separates the cathedral and the governor's mansion, another listed property. The remaining nearby buildings are in a more modernist late 20th-century style. On the west, past a plaza with a small fountain, is the large building that houses the New York State Museum, library and archives. Erastus Corning Tower, the centerpiece of Empire State Plaza and the tallest building in upstate New York, rises to the north behind a high retaining wall. East of the cathedral is a parking garage for state government workers.

Exterior
An iron railing along both sidewalks sets off the church building, shaped like a Latin cross, with two side aisles, clerestory and circular chancel at the west (rear) end. Its nave is five bays long, the transept two bays, and the chancel is divided into seven sections. Two  towers flank the main entrance.

Structurally the nave has vaults dividing its four sections, with secondary ribs and much bossing. The brick walls are faced in sandstone. Slate shingles cover the gabled rolled lead roof.

On the east (front) facade are three portals with crocketed gables, divided by four miniature buttresses with crocketed pinnacles. Two larger buttresses, similarly treated, rise to roof level on either side. A large Gothic tracery window is above them, topped by a small recessed quatrefoil window in the gable apex. At the roofline is a pierced tracery parapet. There are small arched tracery windows in the facade's flanks.

The towers rise four and a half stories to their spires. At the base they are supported by double-angled buttresses on their corners topped with crocketed pinnacles three stories above. The first two stories have paired windows topped by a small quatrefoil under a pointed dripstone. At the third story this pattern changes to double windows under cusped arches topped by a crocketed ogee arch, above which is a line of plain corbels. The fourth story windows, surrounding the belfry, consist of three narrow louvered arches with a cusped dripstone and gable. On the north tower the top half-story is faced on all sides with a clock while a sexfoil window occupies that position to the south. From a castellated base rise the spires, pierced by small narrow gabled dormers just above the base. Rows of vertical crocketing decorate the section lines.

Four more buttresses rise two stories to the roof along the sides of the nave, setting apart Gothic tracery windows. These buttresses, too, are topped with crocketed pinnacles at the castellated roofline. The circular chancel offsets the rectilinearity of the rest of the church.

Interior

The main doors open into a full-width vestibule with flat-beamed ceiling. From it doorways go to the towers and the three aisles of the sanctuary. At its front is a baptismal font of white Caen stone. Walnut pews sit on a marble patterned floor. 

The vaulted ceiling is supported by clustered engaged columns with heavy capitals decorated with organic motifs. Among them are many grapes and grape leaves, a particularly Romanesque touch. Heavy bosses connect the ceiling vaults. Modern electric light fixtures are attached to the walls between the arches. The Stations of the Cross are done as small sculptures along the sides. Between them are the stained glass windows, original to the building.

In the rear the chancel is lighter, emphasizing its verticality. The altar sits on a raised concrete platform. Each of the seven sections is separated by a single column with a small capital. They have a recessed arched panel with a statue of a saint. Above are lancet windows with more stained glass. On its south is the bishop's cathedra.

History

The cathedral was built as much for social reasons as the practical needs of the church in an area where its presence had previously been minimal. It took the latter half of the 19th century to complete, and was only consecrated on its 50th anniversary. The building suffered from neglect in the 20th century, and was extensively restored at the beginning of the 21st.

1796–1847: Catholicism comes to Albany

The small Catholic population that had developed in New York during the 18th century was enough to sustain the entire state as a single parish, primarily concentrated in New York City. St. Mary's Church, formally established in downtown Albany in 1796, was the only Catholic church upstate. Both it and St. Peter's (established in New York City ten years earlier) were part of the Diocese of Baltimore.

In 1808 the Diocese of New York was created. Nine years later, in 1817 Irish immigrants began coming to Albany to build the Erie Canal. The industry that grew around the canal terminus attracted even more immigrants, and the Catholics among them began settling not just in Albany but elsewhere in the Capital District and Mohawk Valley, establishing new churches and subdividing St. Mary's original parish.

Immigration from Ireland rose even more in the 1840s due to the Great Famine. By 1847 the Catholic Church and its congregations were well entrenched in Albany and the other cities of the region, and Pope Pius IX granted requests to establish the Diocese of Albany. John McCloskey, later Archbishop of New York, was installed as the first bishop of Albany in 1847, with St. Mary's as his procathedral.

Like many of the other churches in the new diocese, St. Mary's had been run by a board of trustees due to its distance from the diocesan seat in New York. McCloskey clashed with many of them over their poor financial management, which had left many of them deep in debt. "What should belong to the present and the future is already mortgaged to the past!" complained McCloskey's superior, John Hughes, Archbishop of New York. Before he had taken up his position in Albany, McCloskey had warned that "sooner or later, the trustee system as it exists will destroy or be destroyed by the Catholic religion."

1848–1852: Construction

To accomplish the latter end and consolidate its bishop's authority, the new diocese needed a dedicated cathedral. There were also broader social reasons. Irish Catholic immigration had led to a nativist backlash, in the form of the Know-Nothing Party, and McCloskey knew that a cathedral in Albany would be an assertion of the immigrants' place in their new country. At the first retreat he presided over, McCloskey persuaded the assembled priests to pledge over five thousand dollars as the seed of a building fund.

He commissioned Patrick Keely, an Irish immigrant himself, to design the cathedral, one of 500 churches he would eventually build. Keely was not a design pioneer, but he followed his era's architectural trends closely. For the cathedral he was most influenced by the ideas of British architect Augustus Pugin, as epitomized in Pugin's book True Principles and his St George the Martyr Southwark church in London, both dating to 1841. As a resident of Brooklyn, Keely would also have been familiar with recent American applications of the Gothic Revival style, such as Richard Upjohn's Trinity Church and James Renwick's Grace Church, both Episcopal churches in Manhattan. For Immaculate Conception, he seems to have combined the walls of those two churches with the twin-tower facade of Calvary Church, another Renwick work then under construction.

Over 10,000 watched on a rainy July day in 1848 as McCloskey and Hughes laid the church's cornerstone. McCloskey raised funds for the cathedral's construction from not only the rest of the U.S. but the international Catholic community as well. He wrote to both the Leopoldine Society in Austria-Hungary and the Society for the Propagation of the Faith in France.  To save time he had the interior done in plaster and lath painted to look like stone. Most of the workers were immigrants; many of them volunteered their time and effort. The final construction cost was $250,000 ($ in modern dollars). Hughes and McCloskey returned to dedicate the cathedral late in 1852, and it opened for services thereafter.

1853–1902: Completion and consecration

The building was not yet complete, however. On the outside, the spires had not yet been built. Inside, the west side ended in a wall as the chancel had not been added. In it was set the stained glass window depicting the life of the Virgin Mary, known as the Lady Window, which had been imported from England. It had been designed by H.W. Ackroyd of Sheffield and built by William Wailes of Newcastle-upon-Tyne in a 14th-century style. The other stained glass windows were also imported from England, where they were made in Birmingham.

Construction continued, and by 1858 the money was available to add one of the spires. The north tower was completed in 1862. Its  height made it the city's tallest building for many years. Bells cast at the Meneely Bell Foundry in nearby West Troy (today Watervliet) were hung in the belfry and rung for the first time on the Feast of the Immaculate Conception, December 8, 1862.

In 1868 the iron fencing around the cathedral was added. Fueled by continued immigration, with Germans and Italians joining the Irish, Albany's Catholic population continued to grow in the later 19th century. A restoration was necessary in 1882.

The diocese was able to build the south tower's spire in 1888 and, four years later, the apse and sacristies were added, completing Keeley's design. The interior was also renewed, with the gradual addition of most of the stained glass windows, including the one in the south transept depicting the Last Judgment in 1897. Like many of the interior finishes added during this period, they were European in origin. The choir stalls were carved in Belgium in 1894, and the high pulpit was carved of Dutch oak. 

The original painted Stations of the Cross were replaced with the current Beaux-Arts sculptures, which had won an award at the Paris Exposition of 1889, in 1900. Two years later, on the 50th anniversary of the cathedral's opening, it was formally consecrated by Bishop Thomas Burke. The same year, the exterior was refaced.

1903–2008: Neglect

With the cathedral complete, it played its intended role in the city and the church for the first half of the 20th century. Priests were ordained and bishops consecrated there. Visitors included many cardinals, and leaders from other faiths, such as Michael Ramsey, Archbishop of Canterbury and thus leader of the Church of England. In the 1920s New York elected a Catholic, Al Smith, governor, the first one to be elected to that position in the history of the state. Living in the governor's mansion next door, he became a regular parishioner at the cathedral. In 1928, the year Smith ran unsuccessfully for president, his daughter Catherine was married in the cathedral.

In 1936 the buttresses on the north and south aisles were replaced with stronger ones.  There was no other significant work on the building otherwise during the first half of the century. In the 1960s, however, the cathedral faced a threat to its existence. Most of the neighborhoods to the north and west that had made up its parish were demolished to clear the way for Empire State Plaza, the modernist complex of state government buildings envisioned by Governor Nelson Rockefeller. Only 300 houses remained, and with the resulting diminution of the congregation it was uncertain that the cathedral could survive as an institution—and as just a building, it faced demolition. Rockefeller and Bishop William Scully worked together to prevent that from happening.

Edwin Broderick, Scully's successor, realized that it was not enough to merely save the church. Its age was evident, and it was time to restore it. But he soon realized how extensive the task was, and how costly it would be. It would be limited to new crockets on the towers and, inside, new buttresses for the clerestory.

Howard Hubbard took over as bishop in 1977, the first native of the diocese to achieve that position. His interest in ecumenism led to the first-ever Palm Sunday service of reconciliation between Christians and Jews, held at the cathedral in 1986. At the service, called "From Fear to Friendship" and attended by approximately 1,200 guests, both Christian and Jewish, Hubbard "expressed contrition and remorse for the centuries of anti-Jewish hostility promulgated under the Church's auspices". Portal, a sculpture that stands just west of the building, commemorates the event. Seven years later, in 1993, the daughter of another Catholic governor and parishioner, Mario Cuomo, was married in the cathedral.

2009–present: Restoration

The building continued to deteriorate. Every winter, a ceiling leak in one corner of the roof would form a  icicle, almost reaching the floor. One year in the early 21st century, a large chunk of plaster fell off the ceiling, nearly striking a visiting bishop. Hubbard realized badly needed repair and restoration could no longer be postponed.

He began a campaign to raise money for the work. The estimated cost of everything needed or wanted was $10 million, at first. Ultimately the diocese raised about two-thirds of that amount, and closed the cathedral for a year and a half while rotten structural lumber was replaced, plaster restored, electrical wiring replaced and the walls repainted to, as much as possible, their original colors. The altar was moved closer to the pews and placed on a raised concrete platform, and the baptismal font moved to the rear of the church. The pews themselves were widened and their backs reclined further to make them more comfortable to sit in.

On the outside new sandstone from England replaced the deteriorated original on the north tower and clerestory. Granite steps and new sandstone portals were added to the main entrance. The north tower's spire was completely replaced with new stone when it was found to be leaning  over the street; a new cross was set atop it once it was completed. A rolled lead roof, the only one currently in place in the United States, was installed to make sure it was watertight.

After $19 million total had been spent, the cathedral was reopened in 2010 and rededicated on its 158th anniversary later that year. A thousand people attended the Mass celebrated by Hubbard along with his New York counterpart, Timothy Dolan, and Dolan's predecessor, Cardinal Edward Egan. Hubbard called the cathedral's presence among the many state government buildings nearby a reminder of the presence of God in human affairs and said it was for the whole community, not just Albany's Catholics. He called particular attention to the restored original colors, recalling how he had been disappointed with the building's gloomy interior on his first visit to it as a boy. Many who attended were impressed with the restoration, particularly the return of the original paint.

Music

Music has been a major part of the cathedral's spiritual offerings since its construction, although it has been affected by the same neglect that the building suffered from in the 20th century. Former musical director Thomas Savoy, who composed as well as programmed the musical selections for services, found in his research that the cathedral had a resident orchestra and 75-member choir, and performed classical music regularly at services.

The cathedral sees regular use as a performance space. In addition to an annual schedule of sacred music, it has been host to performances by secular ensembles such as the Albany Symphony Orchestra and Empire State Youth Orchestra. Visiting artists who have performed at the cathedral include Irish tenor Anthony Kearns.

Organ

Upon its opening in 1852, the cathedral had a three-manual pipe organ designed by Henry Erben. It had 42 stops and 3,000 pipes. Modifications in 1880 included overhanging keys, additional notes and mechanical stop control.

In 1947 that organ was incorporated into a new organ built by M.P. Moller's facility in Hagerstown, Maryland. Several ranks of the original pipes were included while the original casework was replaced. A trumpet en chamade was added in 1969.

By the late 1970s vibrations and other damage from the construction of the Empire State Plaza state government complex in the neighborhood had left the organ effectively unusable. An electronic organ was brought in to replace it. When the church was renovated in the first decade of the 21st century it was removed and replaced by a smaller temporary instrument.

The pipes of the Moller organ were removed from the choir loft during the renovation. They were placed into storage in hopes that they will be used again in the future construction of a new pipe organ.

Bells

By the mid-1970s, none of the 10 Meneely bells in the towers had been rung for a long time,  since at least the early 1960s. Their wooden supports, poorly built and incomplete, were too deteriorated. As part of the restoration, one volunteer, Joe Connors, looked into restoring them.

A system had been installed to allow the bells to be run electronically, but Connors discovered that mistakes had been made on both the hardware and the software that ran it. As a result, the Westminster Quarters tones that rang every 15 minutes sounded off-key. According to Savoy, they had been programmed to play notes that the bells themselves didn't have.

After fixing the software errors, Connors got it to play the quarters correctly, but deactivated any other hymns until new software could be purchased. In the meantime, he offered to restore the pulleys and belts that were broken, allowing them to be played manually. By early 2012 Connors had restored seven of the bells.

See also

List of Catholic cathedrals in the United States
List of cathedrals in the United States
Roman Catholic Marian churches
History of Albany, New York
National Register of Historic Places listings in Albany, New York

Further reading
Servier, Christine. History of the Cathedral of the Immaculate Conception, Albany: Argus, 1927.

References

External links

Official Cathedral Site
Roman Catholic Diocese of Albany Official Site

Churches on the National Register of Historic Places in New York (state)
Roman Catholic churches in Albany, New York
Immaculate Conception Albany
Roman Catholic Diocese of Albany
U.S. Route 20
Religious organizations established in 1847
Roman Catholic churches completed in 1852
Roman Catholic parishes of Diocese of Albany
19th-century Roman Catholic church buildings in the United States
1847 establishments in New York (state)
Gothic Revival church buildings in New York (state)
National Register of Historic Places in Albany, New York